Zero Gunner is a shoot 'em up developed by Psikyo and released in 1997. The arcade game allows for eight-way movement using a joystick and supports up to two players at a time. It was notable for its lock on targeting mechanic that allowed players to rotate around targets. The game was succeeded by a sequel, Zero Gunner 2 for the Sega NAOMI/Dreamcast.

Plot
In the future date of 2016, worldwide martial law is initiated when a widespread terrorist organization overthrew and took control of the world's military authorities. A group of ace helicopter pilots are secretly amassed in a special forces squadron called ZERO to travel around the world and destroy the occupied terrorist forces.

Reception 
In Japan, Game Machine listed Zero Gunner on their February 15, 1998 issue as being the sixth most-successful arcade game at the time.

References

External links

1997 video games
Arcade video games
Arcade-only video games
City Connection franchises
Helicopter video games
Psikyo games
Japan-exclusive video games
Scrolling shooters
Multiplayer and single-player video games
Video games developed in Japan